Manchester Day is an annual parade and celebration of Greater Manchester held in Manchester city centre, United Kingdom. The event has been held each June since 2010 and organised by Manchester City Council.

The event is inspired by the New York Thanksgiving parade.

The 2017 Manchester Day was attended by 100,000 people and 22,000 people took part in the parade.

References

Culture in Manchester
Parades in England
Summer events in England